Katya Ivanovna Medvedeva ( Ekaterina Ivanovna Medvedeva; born 1937) is a Russian naïve painter.

Biography 

Yekaterina (Katya) Medvedeva was born January 10, 1937, in the village Golubino of Novooskolsky District in Belgorod Oblast into a peasant family. Her parents died of starvation in 1947, when she was nine years old, and she was brought up in the Shusha's orphanage of the Nagorno-Karabakh autonomous region Azerbaijan SSR.

In her life, she worked at many different jobs, including: a waitress, postwoman, weaver, teacher, costume designer.

In 1976 (aged 39), by chance, she observed a painting class in an arts studio and decided to paint herself, with prolific output. Her paintings were soon recognised by art critics and she began to have exhibitions. Her works are now in public and private collections.

Exhibitions 

Moscow, Kislovodsk, Belgorod, St. Petersburg, Cheboksary, Aged Ladoga, New Oskol, Stary Oskol, Ivangorod (all - Russia). Paris, Nice (France). Darmstadt, Berlin, Mainz (Germany). Chicago, New York City (USA). Copenhagen (Denmark), Stockholm (Sweden), Helsinki (Finland), Prague (Czech Republic).

 1976 First solo show (Russia)
 1979 Regional exhibition of amateur artists in Belgorod, (Russia)
 1981 Solo show at the All-Russian folk Art House, Moscow (Russia)
 1993 Solo show at the Avenue des Champs-Élysées, Paris (France)
 1994 An exhibition together with Marc Chagall, Matisse and Konysheva Natta in Nice (France)
 2004 Solo show "My soul - Painting" from private collections, collections of the Museum-Reserve "Tsaritsyno" and the Russian House of Folk Art (Museum of Private Collections of the Pushkin Museum of Fine Arts), Moscow (Russia)
 2005 The Bolshoi Theatre. M’Ars Centre for Contemporary Arts, Moscow (Russia)
 2005 "Doubts of Beauty" - T.A. Mavrina, Katya Medvedeva. Painting & Graphics at the State Pushkin Museum, Moscow (Russia)
 2006 Painting and Graphic Art 30th Anniversary of the Artist′s Oeuvre. The State Russian Museum, St. Petersburg (Russia)
 2006 Solo show at the Vologda State Historical-Architectural and Art Museum-Reserve, Vologda (Russia)
 2008 The Generous Pancake week. The Art-Soyuz Gallery at the Central House of Artist, Moscow (Russia)
 2008 Paintings, Drawings and DolIs of Katya Medvedeva. Art Center Berlin (Germany)
 2009 12 good art work "Saint George and the Dragon", Gallery A3, Moscow (Russia)

Artistic album 

 2005 My soul - Painting: Album Catalog Publ. Red Square,  (Russian Federation Ministry of Culture, The Pushkin Museum of Fine Arts), Moscow (Russia).

External links 
 Author's site of Katya Medvedeva - naive painting artist
  Blog

Press 
 Moscow Times
 Video 
 Devout dialogue
 Awakening of Russia
 The St. Petersburg Times 2006.04.12 Vorobei A. Devout dialogue
  ZHurnal "Аlfavit" № 33, 2000. Lerner L.
  Biografiya: Katya Medvedeva
  ZHurnal "CHajka" № 10, 2003, Lerner L. Katya Medvedeva tantsuet "ZHizel'"
  "Ezhednevnyj zhurnal" № 106, 2004 Kovalev A. Natsional'naya ideya: novye otkrytiya
  "Izvestiya" 06.02.2004 Kabanova O. Naivnaya khudozhnitsa Katya Medvedeva pokazala sebya v Pushkinskom muzee
  "SHirokaya maslenitsa" Kati Medvedevoj
  Katya Medvedeva - prostota pravdy
  Starikov E. Vklad v kul'turu // Vologodskie novosti. – 2006. - № 11. – 22-28 marta. – S. 4.
  Kartiny, kotorye ya khotel by ukrast' - Katya Medvedeva
  Katya Medvedeva. ZHivopis', grafika. K 30-letiyu tvorcheskoj deyatel'nosti. ZHurnal "Russkoe iskusstvo"
  ZHurnal "Аnturazh"  2009 № 03-04, KHronika - vremya, sobytiya, lyudi: Blagotvoritel'nyj artproekt "12 khoroshikh rabot"
  "The New World Art", Аkimova D. Katya Medvedeva: detskie mechty — vzroslye igrushki

Museum 

  The Museum of naive art of the Eastern District of Moscow (Russia)

Art Gallery 
 300 km from Moscow
 PaysageIntime Gallery
  SDM-Bank, Moscow (Russia)
  "ThoMa", Kasimov (Russia)
  ArtLib.ru
 Gelos Auction House
  Gallery A3
 VArt Collection

References 

1937 births
Living people
People from Belgorod Oblast
20th-century Russian painters
21st-century Russian painters
Naïve painters